Anton Muzychkin (born 16 December 1994) is a Belarusian cyclist, who currently rides for UCI Continental team . He competed in the scratch event at the 2013 and 2014 UCI Track Cycling World Championships.

Major results
2012
 1st  Scratch, UCI Junior World Track Championships
 2nd Points race, National Track Championships
2013
 1st  Scratch, European Under-23 Track Championships
 4th Time trial, National Road Championships
2014
 1st  Scratch, National Track Championships
2015
 3rd Time trial, National Under-23 Road Championships
2017
 National Track Championships
1st  Team pursuit
1st  Madison (with Raman Ramanau)
2nd Omnium
3rd Points race
 2nd Time trial, National Road Championships
 4th Belgrade–Banja Luka I
 7th Tour de Ribas

References

External links

1994 births
Living people
Belarusian track cyclists
Belarusian male cyclists
People from Gomel